"I Feel Love (Every Million Miles)" is a single by the Dead Weather from their third studio album, Dodge and Burn. The song was first released on the streaming service Tidal, but was made available to download when pre-ordering the album on August 21. "I Feel Love (Every Million Miles)" and its B-side "Cop and Go" were released exclusively in physical format through Third Man Records' subscription service The Vault as a 7-inch vinyl single in September 2015.

The music video for the "I Feel Love (Every Million Miles)" was nominated for the 2016 Grammy Award for Best Music Video.

Personnel
 Alison Mosshart – vocals
 Dean Fertita – guitar
 Jack Lawrence – bass
 Jack White – drums

References

External links
 

The Dead Weather songs
2015 singles
2015 songs
Third Man Records singles
Songs written by Alison Mosshart
Songs written by Dean Fertita